Matthäus Georg von Chandelle (born 1745 in Frankfurt) was a German clergyman and bishop for the Roman Catholic Diocese of Speyer. He was ordained in 1769. He was appointed bishop in 1818. He died in 1826.

References 

1745 births
1826 deaths
German Roman Catholic bishops